Sundaranachiyapuram is a village located nearby Rajapalayam, in Virudhunagar district, Tamil Nadu, India. It is a small village, with around 1300 families.

History
Sundaranachiapuram was born in 1888 from sundar raja puram, It is named for the Hindu god Sundaranachiamman. The Sundaranachiamman temple is 2 km.

In the nineteenth century it was under the control of Seithur Zamindhar who oppressed the people of Sundaranachiapuram and filed a case against them. Some heads of the village sought the help of the Jesuit missionary Father J. B. Trincal who was stationed at W. Pudupatti. The villagers agreed to embrace Christianity provided that they were freed from the seithur zamindhar. In 1888, 12 July he sav the unlettered victims and won the case. As a result, the whole village became Christian, but Sundar Raja puram people remain the same with Seithur Zamindhar.

Work
Agriculture is the main occupation of the people. Crops include coconut, paddy rice, mango, sugarcane, cotton, millet, roots and tuber crops, maize, cucumber, pumpkin and various vegetables.

Most of the irrigation is done in traditional ways. Water sources are mostly wells and in some cases surface water being pumped into the farmlands.

There are also masons (kothanar), embroidery, and brickmakers (sengal soolai).

School
Two schools were established 150 years ago by Roman Catholic priests:
St. Joseph's Middle School
St. Theresa Elementary School

Temples and Churches
The village has two temples and a church:
Pillaiyar Koil
Krishnan Koil
Our Lady of Lourdes Church is more than a hundred years old, built by French Jesuits. Every year on 14 and 15 August, the church festival is celebrated, and the famous Thier Bavani (car festival) is held.

Climate
The climate of the region is semi-arid tropical monsoon type. Temperatures range from 25 °C to 37 °C. The area has a high mean temperature and low humidity. April, May and June are the hottest months of the year. The southwest monsoon which begins in June and lasts till August brings scanty rain; the bulk of the rainfall is received during the northeast monsoon in October and November.

Villages in Virudhunagar district